The Villain is a 1917 American silent comedy film featuring Oliver Hardy.

Cast
 Billy West as Billy
 Oliver Hardy as Babe (billed as Babe Hardy)
 Florence McLaughlin as Florence (billed as Florence McLoughlin)
 Bud Ross as Budd (as Budd Ross)
 Ethelyn Gibson
 Leo White
 Joe Cohen

See also
 Oliver Hardy filmography

External links

1917 films
1917 comedy films
1917 short films
Silent American comedy films
American silent short films
American black-and-white films
Films directed by Arvid E. Gillstrom
American comedy short films
1910s American films
1910s English-language films